Eduardo López Riaza (born 29 December 1964 in Pozuelo de Alarcón) is a wheelchair basketball athlete from Spain.  He has a physical disability: he is a 1-point wheelchair basketball player. He played wheelchair basketball at the 1996 Summer Paralympics. His team was fourth.

References

External links 
 
 

Wheelchair category Paralympic competitors
Spanish men's wheelchair basketball players
Paralympic wheelchair basketball players of Spain
Living people
1964 births
Wheelchair basketball players at the 1996 Summer Paralympics
People from Madrid
20th-century Spanish people